Muhammad Zain  (born 2 November 2006) is a Pakistani first-class cricketer who plays for Khan Research Laboratories. In April 2018, he was named in Punjab's squad for the 2018 Pakistan Cup. In September 2019, he was named in Southern Punjab's squad for the 2019–20 Quaid-e-Azam Trophy tournament.

References

External links
 

1991 births
Living people
Pakistani cricketers
Khan Research Laboratories cricketers
Kurunegala Youth Cricket Club cricketers
Sindh cricketers
Cricketers from Khanewal
Southern Punjab (Pakistan) cricketers